Robert Kendall Goff is a lawyer, speaker, and author of the New York Times best-selling books Love Does and Everybody, Always. Goff currently works with Love Does, formerly known as Restore International, a non-profit organization he founded.

Philanthropic work 
Goff founded Restore International (now known as Love Does) in 2003 to “find daring, productive, and effective ways to fight the injustices committed against children.”
Love Does works to promote human rights and education in current and recovering conflict zones. Love Does currently works in Uganda, Iraq, Nepal, Somalia, Afghanistan, India, and the Dominican Republic

Career 
Goff founded Goff and Dewalt, LLP (along with Daniel J DeWalt) in 1998 as a construction defect attorney. Located in Washington, the firm specializes in construction defect litigation, general counsel, and international rights (through Restore International).

Goff worked as an adjunct professor at Point Loma Nazarene University where he taught a class in business law. Goff similarly serves as an adjunct professor to Pepperdine University, in both the law school and the graduate degree programs, with courses such as Nonprofit Law in the Global Justice Program.

Goff is also a writer and an international motivational speaker. In 2016 he launched the Dream Big Framework, a curriculum and workshop designed to motivate people to accomplish their biggest dreams and ambitions. He has also invested in a Southern California retreat center, The Oaks, to be used as a hosting site for various workshops and events.

Works 

 Love Does. Nashville, TN: Thomas Nelson (2012).
 Everybody, Always. Nashville, TN: Nelson Books (2018).
 Live in Grace, Walk in Love. Nashville, TN: Nelson Books (2019). 
 Dream Big. Nashville, TN: Nelson Books (2020).
 Undistracted. Nashville, TN: Nelson Books (2022).

References

External links
 Bob Goff website

Living people
21st-century American writers
1959 births
21st-century Christians